The House of Borgia was a Valencian-Italian noble family prominent during the Renaissance.

Borgia or the Borgias may also refer to:

Places
Borgia, Calabria, Italy
Zec Borgia, a protected hunting and fishing area in Quebec, Canada

People
The Borgia popes, the Popes who belonged to the House of Borgia

Animals
Borgia (horse), a thoroughbred racehorse

Art, entertainment, and media

Film
The Borgia (2006), a Spanish film directed by Antonio Hernández

Literature
"The Borgias", a chapter in Celebrated Crimes by Alexandre Dumas

Television

Borgia (TV series), also known as Borgia: Faith and Fear - a 2011 French/German historical fiction television series
The Borgias (1981 TV series), a BBC television serial
The Borgias (2011 TV series), a Showtime historical fiction television series